Valery Ivanovich Korolenkov (born 17 May 1939; died 10 December 2007) was a Soviet Russian footballer.

Honours
 Soviet Top League winner: 1959, 1963.

International career
He earned five caps for the USSR national football team and participated in the 1964 European Nations' Cup, where the Soviets were the runners-up.

External links
Profile (in Russian)

1939 births
Footballers from Moscow
2007 deaths
Soviet footballers
Association football midfielders
Soviet Union international footballers
Soviet Top League players
FC Dynamo Moscow players
FC Lokomotiv Moscow players
FC Dynamo Makhachkala players